Montenegro has had a motorway since July 13, 2022, when the first section of the Bar-Boljare motorway was inaugurated.

Belgrade–Bar Motorway 
The Belgrade–Bar motorway, also known in Serbian and Montenegrin as Аутопут Београд–Бар (Autoput Beograd–Bar) will measure  and be part of the European route E763 (E763). The whole motorway in Montenegro from Bar to the border with Serbia in Boljare will be . It is a challenging project, which has been divided into five component parts (dionica). It will have a total of 42 tunnels and 92 bridges. The first part of construction is financed as public–private partnership project and the contractor was the Chinese company CRBC. The Smokovac–Mateševo section of motorway cost approximately €1 billion. The motorway is subjected to a toll payment like in other countries of the former Yugoslavia. For the currently open section -  - the toll for passenger vehicles is 3.50 euros. At the beginning of 2022, the Ministry of Capital Investments announced the development of a conceptual project for the second section, from Mateševo to Andrijevica, whose deadline for development is the end of the year. The Minister of Capital Investments, Ervin Ibrahimović, announced in an interview on January 8, 2023 that the next section of the highway to be built will be Mateševo–Andrijevica, with the selection of the contractor and supervision in 2025.

Adriatic–Ionian Motorway 
From there it may continue through Albania and further reach Greece.

References

External links 
 http://www.novosti.rs/vesti/planeta.300.html:584194-Ministarstvo-U-2016-godini-intenzivna-gradnja-autoputa-u-Crnoj-Gori
 http://www.vijesti.me/tag/autoput-bar-boljare-24193

Controlled-access highways by country
Roads in Montenegro